Hexham Middle School is a coeducational middle school located in Hexham, Northumberland, England. It is in a multi-academy trust (Hadrian Learning Trust) with  Queen Elizabeth High School and many pupils transfer there to continue their secondary education.

In September 2021 it moved to a new building on the same site as Queen Elizabeth High School.

The Executive Headteacher is Graeme Atkins and the Head of School is Liam Watters.

References

External links
 School website

Middle schools in Northumberland
Academies in Northumberland
Hexham